Protohadros (meaning "first hadrosaur") is a genus of herbivorous ornithischian dinosaur from the Late Cretaceous (Cenomanian stage).

Gary Byrd, a part-time palaeontologist, discovered some remains of this euornithopod (ribs and an ungual) during early 1994 at Flower Mound, Denton County, north-central Texas. He informed professional palaeontologist Yuong-Nam Lee of the find, who arranged for the entire preserved fossil to be excavated. It was first reported upon in 1996 by Jason Head of the Dedman College of Humanities and Sciences, Southern Methodist University. The type species Protohadros byrdi was described and named by Head in 1998. The genus name is derived from Greek πρῶτος, protos, "first", en ἁδρός, hadros, "thick", a reference to the fact that Head considered the species the oldest known hadrosaur. The specific name honours Byrd.

The holotype, specimen SMU 74582, of Protohadros, was found in the Woodbine Formation, which dates to the middle Cenomanian. It consists of a partial skull, pieces of ribs, a hand ungual and a neural arch. In 1997 Lee named possible tracks of Protohadros as the ichnospecies Caririchnium protohadrosaurichnos.

Due to the paucity of the remains much of the reconstruction of this dinosaur is speculative. The skull is about seventy centimetres long. From this Head estimated the length of the type specimen of Protohadros at seven to eight metres. He pointed out that this specimen was that of a subadult and that fully-grown individuals could have been longer. Protohadros had a massive, very deep set of lower jaws, and the snout was strongly turned down at the front, which according to Head suggested a habit of grazing on low-growing plants, rather than browsing from bushes or overhanging branches. Its diet would then have consisted of the swamp plants which grew in the delta streams in its habitat, scooped up by the broad, down-turned mouth. In some respects Protohadros was intermediate in morphology to more derived hadrosaurids. Like these it did have pleurokinesis, a cranial joint system that produced the food-grinding action, but only partially in that the quadrate at the back of the skull was still relatively immobile.

Protohadros rear legs were probably longer than the front pair, and it could move on all fours or walk and run on its hind legs only.

Protohadros was first described as the most basal member of the Hadrosauridae, hence its generic name. However, scientific opinion has since changed and it is now regarded as a non-hadrosaurid iguanodontian, a basal member of the Hadrosauroidea, though one closely related to the Hadrosauridae. The dinosaur's discovery conflicted with the idea that hadrosaurids evolved in Asia, but its reassessment as a less-derived iguanodontian has rendered this discrepancy less problematic.

References

External links
 Protohadros in the Dino Directory

Iguanodonts
Late Cretaceous dinosaurs of North America
Fossil taxa described in 1998
Paleontology in Texas